Yongbei Zhuang is a Zhuang variety including the dialects of Yongning North, Binyang, Hengxian, and Pingguo dialects. 'Yongbei' 邕北 is Chinese and here means North of the Yongjiang river; in other contexts it can stand for the north of Yongning County, or Yongning North.

As an areal group Yongbei includes Wuming dialect, the basis of Standard Zhuang. However, Wuming falls in the Yongnan-Wuming Zhuang comparative group.

References

Languages of China
Tai languages